United Nations Security Council Resolution 761, adopted unanimously on 29 June 1992, after reaffirming Resolutions 713 (1991), 721 (1991), 724 (1991), 727 (1992), 740 (1992) 743 (1992), 749 (1992), 752 (1992), 757 (1992), 758 (1992) and 760 (1992), the Council authorised the Secretary-General to immediately deploy additional elements of the United Nations Protection Force in Croatia and Bosnia and Herzegovina during the Yugoslav Wars.

The Council authorised the deployment to ensure the security and functioning of Sarajevo International Airport to facilitate the delivery of humanitarian aid, appealing to all sides to co-operate with the Force in the reopening of the airport. It also called on the parties to observe the ceasefire and co-operate with the Force, international organisations and Member States in providing aid.

Resolution 761 increased the Force in Sarajevo to one infantry battalion, while Resolution 764 would increase it to two. The Force would protect the airport since it, and the capital, came under attack from Bosnian Serbs on 5 June 1992.

See also
 Breakup of Yugoslavia
 Bosnian War
 Croatian War of Independence
 List of United Nations Security Council Resolutions 701 to 800 (1991–1993)
 Slovenian Independence War
 Yugoslav Wars

References

External links
 
Text of the Resolution at undocs.org

 0761
 0761
1992 in Yugoslavia
1992 in Bosnia and Herzegovina
 0761
June 1992 events